The 2015 European Athletics Junior Championships were the 23rd edition of the biennial European U20 athletics championships. They were held in Eskilstuna, Sweden from 16 July to 19 July.

The medal table was topped by Great Britain with 17 medals overall, including 11 golds, ahead of Germany and Russia.

Medal summary

Men

Women

Medal table

References

External links
All Results (archived)

European Athletics Junior Championships
International athletics competitions hosted by Sweden
2015 in Swedish sport
European Athletics U20 Championships
2015 in youth sport